Queen and pawn may refer to:
 Queen versus pawn endgame
 Queen and pawn versus queen endgame